The 2019 División Profesional season (officially the Copa de Primera TIGO-Visión Banco 2019 for sponsorship reasons) was the 85th season of top-flight professional football in Paraguay. The season began on 22 January and ended on 15 December. The fixtures for the season were announced on 13 December 2018. Olimpia were the defending champions after winning both tournaments of the 2018 season, and won a third championship in a row in the Torneo Apertura with three matches to spare after defeating Deportivo Santaní by a 6–0 score on 4 May. Olimpia also crowned themselves in the Torneo Clausura, winning a fourth title in a row with one matchday remaining, following a 2–2 draw at home against Guaraní on 8 December.

Teams
Twelve teams competed in the season: the top ten teams in the relegation table of the previous season, and two teams promoted from the División Intermedia. The new teams were 2018 División Intermedia champions River Plate and runners-up San Lorenzo, who returned to the top flight after two and three years, respectively. Both replaced Independiente (CG) and 3 de Febrero, who were relegated to the second tier after two and one year, respectively.

Stadia and locations

Note: Teams occasionally play their home games at Estadio Defensores del Chaco in Asunción. Derbies between Cerro Porteño and Olimpia are also played at this stadium.
a: Sportivo Luqueño will play their home games at Estadio La Arboleda in Asunción as their regular stadium Estadio Feliciano Cáceres is closed for repair works. They played their Torneo Apertura home game against San Lorenzo at Estadio Erico Galeano in Capiatá.

Managerial changes

Torneo Apertura
The Campeonato de Apertura, named "Víctor Genes", was the 119th official championship of the Primera División and the first championship of the 2019 season. It started on January 22 and concluded on May 20.

Standings

Results

Top goalscorers

Source: Soccerway

Torneo Clausura
The Campeonato de Clausura, named "Ranulfo Miranda y 100 años de la Cruz Roja Paraguaya", was the 120th official championship of the Primera División and the second championship of the 2019 season. It started on July 12 and concluded on December 15.

Standings

Results

Top goalscorers
{| class="wikitable" border="1"
|-
! Rank
! Name
! Club
! Goals
|-
| align=center | 1
| Roque Santa Cruz
|Olimpia
| align=center | 15
|-
| align=center | 2
| Antonio Bareiro
|Libertad
| align=center | 10
|-
| align=center | 3
| Santiago Salcedo
|Deportivo Capiatá
| align=center | 9
|-
| rowspan=2 align=center | 4
| Fernando Fernández
|Guaraní
| rowspan=2 align=center | 8
|-
| Brian Montenegro
|Olimpia
|-
| rowspan=6 align=center | 6
| Diego Churín
|Cerro Porteño
| rowspan=6 align=center | 6
|-
| Nelson Haedo Valdez
|Cerro Porteño
|-
| José Ortigoza
|Guaraní
|-
| Óscar Ruiz
|Cerro Porteño
|-
| Alejandro Silva
|Olimpia
|-
| Leonardo Villagra
|Nacional
|}

Source: Soccerway

Aggregate table

Relegation
Relegation is determined at the end of the season by computing an average of the number of points earned per game over the past three seasons. The two teams with the lowest average were relegated to the División Intermedia for the following season.

 Updated to games played on 15 December 2019. Source: APF

References

External links
APF's official website 

Paraguay
Paraguayan Primera División seasons
2019 in Paraguayan football